Tomas Aoake (born 6 September 1995) is a New Zealand rugby union player, currently playing for the San Diego Legion of Major League Rugby (MLR) and  of the National Provincial Championship. His preferred position is wing.

Professional career
Aoake signed for Major League Rugby side San Diego Legion for the 2022 Major League Rugby season.

References

External links
itsrugby.co.uk Profile

1995 births
Living people
Rugby union wings
New Zealand rugby union players
Tasman rugby union players
North Harbour rugby union players
San Diego Legion players
Auckland rugby union players